Cwm Albion Football Club was a Welsh football club based in Cwm, Monmouthshire.

History
The club joined Division Two of the Southern League in 1911, at a time when the league contained several clubs based in South Wales. They played at a basic ground, which was accessed by crossing two fields. The ground was not enclosed and many fans watched matches from surrounding hillsides. The home team changed in the village, whilst the away team changed in a disused cow shed. After one match the referee was chased by Cwm supporters, who threw him into the river. After sheltering in a house, the referee was escorted to the railway station by police.

Their season in the Southern League was disrupted by the 1912 coal strike, and four matches were left unplayed. The club was forced to leave the league shortly before the end of the season due to financial problems, and finished second from bottom of the table.

References

Defunct football clubs in Wales
Southern Football League clubs
Sport in Monmouthshire